Lynette Scavo is a fictional character from the American comedy drama television series Desperate Housewives, which aired on ABC from 2004 to 2012. Developed by series creator Marc Cherry, Lynette was portrayed by Felicity Huffman. Lynette is introduced as a frustrated stay-at-home mother of four children, who she had with her businessman husband Tom (Doug Savant). Formerly a high-powered businesswoman herself, Lynette aspires to return to working life as she struggles with the day-to-day tasks of motherhood.

While show creator Marc Cherry based Bree Van de Kamp's family on his teenage years, he based Lynette's on his childhood life. Other actresses who claim to have auditioned for the show include Alex Kingston, who was apparently turned down for being too curvy. Huffman won the Emmy Award for Outstanding Lead Actress in a Comedy Series for the role in 2005, and was nominated for Golden Globe Award for Best Actress – Television Series Musical or Comedy for 2005 to 2007.

Storylines

Backstory
Lynette Lindquist was the eldest of three daughters born to Stella and her husband, Mr. Lindquist. After he died, their mother had a series of unpleasant and unstable boyfriends and a drinking problem. She also beat her children and had cancer, when Lynette was 13 years old. Lynette told her that this was a punishment from God. Stella marries Glenn Wingfield, whom Lynette adores. After a short time, Glenn leaves, and Lynette blames her mother for driving him away for a long time.

During college at Northwestern University, around 1990, Lynette met Renee Perry and two of them become loyal friends. She graduated and, while working in advertising, she became a "business shark" and almost a vice president, but she met Tom Scavo at the same company. He was so in love that he broke up with his girlfriend, Annabel Foster. Tom and Lynette married in 1997 and moved to Wisteria Lane the following year. Lynette had four children with Tom: twins Preston and Porter born in February 1998, Parker born in November 1998, and Penny born in 2004. She had a very successful career, but she gave up all that to become a stay-at-home mother.

In 1998 the Scavos met Mary Alice Young, Bree Van de Kamp, and Susan Mayer, followed by Gabrielle Solis in 2003. After a short and difficult first impression of Gaby, all four women accepted the ex-model as a friend.

Season 1
As the series begins, Lynette is near to breaking point - she has been stuck at home alone with four kids for 6 years. Her husband is always away on business trips or at work. Lynette struggles to cope with her four children until Preston and Porter are prescribed medication for ADHD (attention-deficit hyperactivity disorder). Lynette decides not to medicate them and starts taking the medication herself so she can have more energy in order to make the costumes for a school play. Realizing she is addicted, Lynette manages to stop taking the pills after she and Tom hire a nanny. Unfortunately the nanny doesn't stay long as she catches Tom's eye a little too much. Her problems worsen when Tom tells her that he has been offered a lucrative promotion that would take him away from home more often, which he refused to discuss with her, so she makes sure that his boss doesn't offer him the promotion. When Tom finds out about what Lynette has done, he quit his job, and in the season finale informs her that she will be going back to work. Lynette also has trouble with Tom's ex-girlfriend, Annabel Foster. So, she talks to an executive of her old firm, and Tom's firm, to hire his ex as the VP of the firm, which she willingly does. When Tom finds out what Lynette had done, he forgives her, and decides to become a stay-at-home dad, and so she has to go back to work and take over as the breadwinner for the family.

Season 2
Lynette gets a job at an advertising agency and for much of the season, deals with obstacles at work and colleagues. Stu, a bumbling secretary at the agency, is kind to Lynette, often doing her favors or helping her in tough situations. Nina is the "boss from hell"; mean, self-centered and neurotic. She causes Lynette many problems and stresses her out with work. Ed Ferrara, the boss, is the seemingly cool guy but his faults lead to Tom getting fired after working with her at the agency for a while. Lynette also testifies for Bree when she is accused of child abuse but makes Bree realize she has a problem with alcohol. At the end of the season, Lynette thinks Tom is cheating on her but discovers Tom has another child  - resulting from a one-night stand before he met Lynette - a daughter, Kayla Huntington. She and her mother, Nora Huntington, use the back child support from Tom to move to Fairview so Kayla can get to know her father, stepmother, and half-siblings.

Season 3
Lynette has trouble adjusting to Nora and Kayla being around but does her best. Lynette learns Nora wants Tom back and warns her to keep her distance. When Nora decides to leave town with Kayla in tow, Lynette and Tom sue for custody. However, a court date becomes unnecessary when Nora and Lynette are held hostage in a supermarket by Carolyn Bigsby - Nora is shot and killed during the standoff. As Nora lays dying, Lynette pledges to always care for Kayla. Lynette is shot in the arm, but survives. Lynette and Kayla struggle to get on as Kayla blames Lynette for her mother's death. When an out-of-work Tom follows his lifelong dream to open a pizzeria, Lynette attempts to support him. When a back injury leaves Tom bedridden and Lynette solely responsible for the operation of the restaurant, Lynette hires a manager, Rick, for whom she quickly develops romantic feelings. Tom, jealous and suspicious, demands that Rick leave the business but Rick refuses. When he confesses to Lynette that he is attracted to her, she fires him, establishing firmly that her family matters more than her business. Following a nasty fall out of bed, Lynette undergoes a CAT scan which reveals swollen lymph nodes. In the season finale, Lynette tells her sister Lucy that she has been diagnosed with Hodgkin's lymphoma and asks her for a loan. Lucy is sympathetic but unable to help as her husband has just lost his job. Tom borrows the money from Lynette's mother, Stella Wingfield, much to his wife's chagrin. Stella tells Lynette that she is moving in to help with the family while Lynette fights cancer.

Season 4
While undergoing chemotherapy, Lynette wears wigs to conceal her illness and avoid the pity of friends and neighbors. When she finally confesses, her friends are shocked but supportive. In a fit of pique at being served marijuana-laced brownies, Lynette decides that Stella has to go. While she soon changes her mind and asks her mother to stay, Stella is hurt and leaves the Scavo home. When Lynette learns that Glenn left Stella because he is gay, she tells her mother that she appreciates the time they've spent together. Stella, not wanting to ruin the happy memories, decides not to return and moves in with Glenn. A short time later, a tornado threatens Fairview and Lynette persuades her elderly neighbor, Karen McCluskey, to let the Scavos shelter in her cellar. Ida Greenberg and her cat join them but Tom, allergic to cats, starts struggling to breathe. Lynette attempts to sneak the cat out of the shelter, and Karen follows her into the storm. As the tornado hits, Karen and Lynette are forced to shelter in a bathtub in the Scavo house. After the tornado, Lynette and Karen find the McCluskey house in ruins. Lynette's family is safe, but only because Ida Greenberg died to save them. Kayla begins a pattern of disrespectful behavior, which culminates when Lynette slaps her for threatening Penny. Kayla takes revenge by burning herself with a curling iron and blaming Lynette, who is arrested. While in jail, Lynette tells Tom what Kayla did. When Kayla confesses that she lied, Tom sends her to live with her grandparents. He is sad to send her away, but in time the family (and Tom and Lynette's marriage) recovers from the strain placed upon it by Kayla.

Five-year jump
Lynette and Tom are still running the pizzeria, Preston, Porter, and Parker are teenagers and Penny is nine. Lynette's hair is back and Kayla is gone and not mentioned at all.

Season 5
After the five-year time jump, Tom and Lynette are still running the pizzeria and having trouble with their twin sons, now teenagers. Tom is having a mid-life crisis - he often sides with his disobedient sons, and he starts a band with the other neighborhood husbands, all to the irritation of his wife.

Lynette and Tom discover that Porter is having an affair with Anne Schilling, an older married woman. Anne tells Porter that she is having his baby and they make plans to run away together. When Lynette confronts Anne about her affair with Porter, they are overheard by Anne's abusive husband Warren. When Lynette later finds Warren beating Anne severely, Warren jeeringly dares the women to phone the police, because Anne is guilty of statutory rape. That evening, when Tom's band plays a gig at Warren's nightclub, Porter and Warren fight but Lynette intervenes again. She confronts Warren about hitting women and children. Warren locks the doors, and when Dave Williams sets fire to the club, it causes a panic. The club patrons escape through a window, but Warren blames Porter for the fire. Porter is arrested and released on bail. Lynette pays Anne to leave town without Warren, and asks to be notified when the baby is born. Anne admits that there is no baby. After Warren threatens his life, Porter jumps bail and leaves town. Tom and Lynette get Preston to pose as Porter in court. When he is discovered hiding at his grandmother's nursing home, Porter returns and the charges are dropped. Unfortunately, legal bills and the payoff to Anne have left the Scavos broke and Tom is forced to sell the pizzeria.

Lynette returns to the workforce, working for Carlos Solis. In the finale, Lynette starts feeling ill and fears her cancer is active, although she is pregnant with another set of twins.

Season 6
In her first trimester, Lynette is depressed about the prospect of having twins so late in life and fears she will not love them. She hides the pregnancy from her boss, Carlos, so as not to jeopardize her promotion. Gabrielle soon discovers the truth, and is angry with Lynette for putting the future of Carlos' company at stake. She does not tell Carlos, although Lynette thought she would, so reveals her secret to him without knowledge. He tells her that her options are to move to Miami or to quit. He then gives her a huge amount of work to do in one night, but when Lynette attends her daughter's Christmas pageant instead, Carlos subsequently fires her. Lynette and Gaby's friendship becomes strained, but is restored when Lynette saves Celia Solis from being hit by a plane that crashes on Wisteria Lane. Following the crash, Lynette is in pain and realizes something is wrong with the babies. Her doctor discovers one of the twins needs circulatory surgery. While unconscious, Lynette dreams of the struggle of life with a disabled child. The dream ends with her disabled son's graduation, where he thanks her for always challenging him. When she awakens, Tom tells her that the ill baby died but the other survived. Despite her early reluctance to have these twins at all, Lynette sobs for her lost baby. She has trouble processing her grief until Tom suggests that she stay home with their daughter after she is born.

Later in the season, Preston returns from Europe with a Russian woman named Irina. Lynette investigates and learns that Irina is a gold digger and prostitute, but Irina is killed by the Fairview Strangler. She invites the troubled teen Eddie Orlofsky to live with her family, unaware that he is the Fairview Strangler. Eddie becomes protective of Lynette, attacking Porter and nearly attacking Tom when each of them treats her in a way Eddie regards as disrespectful. Tom and Lynette agree that Eddie must see a therapist. The therapist suggests that Eddie's progress would improve if his mother accompanied him to therapy. However, no one answers the door at Eddie's house even though his mother's car is still there, and Lynette's suspicions are raised. When she learns that both Irina and Eddie's mother have been found dead, she confronts Eddie at his house and he traps her inside. With her life at Eddie's mercy, Lynette goes into labor. She gives birth to her daughter, Paige, with Eddie's help.  Eddie attempts to flee, but Lynette begs him to turn himself in, telling him that she would be proud to have a son like him.  Eddie asks Lynette to do it for him.  Lynette agrees, letting him hold the baby while she dials 911.

Season 7
While raising their new baby daughter Paige, Tom is diagnosed with male postpartum depression. She invites her old college roommate, Renee Perry, to stay when she learns of her on-going divorce. But she is astonished that Renee is taking Tom's diagnosis seriously.  Renee (who is still staying in the Scavo home) warns Lynette that she should take Tom’s concerns more seriously, but Lynette ignores this. Lynette is especially angered when she learns that Tom has been confiding in Renee, listening to his problems when Lynette will not. One evening, Lynette learns that the two have gone to dinner but left a message for her to join them if she wishes. Angry, Lynette meets the two at a restaurant just as they are discussing Lynette’s dismissive behavior towards Tom. Lynette pulls Renee aside and tells her that it is inappropriate to be so close to Tom and demands that their current friendship be toned down. That night, Lynette realizes she needs to be there for her husband more often and the two decide to simply talk to each other rather than make love, thus making progress in their marriage. Renee later apologizes to Lynette and is forgiven, and reveals that she has just bought Edie Britt’s former home on Wisteria Lane. Lynette is hesitant to the idea, but happy nonetheless. In private, Tom warns Renee that it may be a bad idea for her to be their neighbor because he is afraid Lynette may find out about “something that happened” between him and Renee years earlier.

Lynette and Renee start a new business in interior design, after a little persuasion from Renee. Renee suggests hiring Susan as Lynette's nanny. Lynette is reluctant, but eventually agrees. Lynette ends up comforting Susan when she feels bad about not being as financially stable as her friends. Mike has taken the job in Alaska, and Susan accepts Lynette's offer to be baby Paige's nanny, even though she thought she was being hired to work in Lynette and Renee's new business. She overhears a new client of Lynette and Renee's, and suggests that she ask her daughter for her favorite characters to paint on her wall. The woman likes Susan's idea. Renee gets mad at Susan, while Lynette wonders why her friend is acting strange. Susan eventually reveals that she feels the nanny job is beneath her, and is shamed to be the poor person in her group of friends. Lynette comforts her, saying that money can't change the way she looks in their eyes. Lynette is shown to be insecure in their marriage when Tom complains that she never "talks him up" to her friends. She admits to him that this is because she believes he is so perfect, that she doesn't deserve to be with him. He tells her that she is the type of person who still cries when their last child grows out of their onesies, even after raising four other children. Lynette learns that Renee and Tom had a one-night stand 20 years ago which happened right after Tom and Lynette became engaged and she was visiting her parents (they were on a break). She doesn't take it well, and is of course upset but keeps it quiet and instead begins a series of pranks against Tom as payback. When Renee finds out what Lynette is doing, she tells Tom about it. Tom confronts Lynette and informs her that he wanted to tell her about Renee, but there was never a good time for it because he did not want to ruin the wonderful life they have together. Lynette then forgives Tom.

Tom gets a new job that provides well and Renee encourages Lynette to spend money more freely but also warns her that Tom will be spending more time away. Lynette tries to seduce Tom on an airplane but he insists that he enjoys his work too much. When Tom attends a conference, Lynette is upset that she is unable to attend any of the events because she's just a wife, relegated to spa time and other events with other wives. She tries to encourage them to fight for their equality but they're all happy with being out of the business side of things. Lynette steals one woman's ID to attend a talk only to discover she has the identity of the keynote speaker. Back home, Renee watches as Tom and Lynette argue, Tom snapping that after so many years supporting Lynette, it hurts that she won't do the same for him. Lynette complains to Renee but she fires back that Lynette has to choose whether to be a good wife or not. Tom hires the duo to decorate his office in the style of an arrogant boss but Lynette vetoes it as she feels it's not right for him. Renee overrules her to give Tom the office he wants.  Lynette confronts Tom over how this isn't really him but he retorts that it's how he has to be in order to succeed and that Lynette needs to stop thinking of him as the soft man he's been at home for the last few years.

When Tom decides to book a luxurious holiday for the family and announces it Lynette is annoyed and consults Tom about why he did not consult her about it first (since she already informed him a few weeks ago that she had already planned a trip). The two then pitch to the kids what they think is the best holiday which leads to yet another fight between them; this time however they insult each other. Lynette calls Tom a "Pompous Ass" while Tom labels Lynette as a "Raging Bitch" leaving them to decide that it is only them who need to spend a holiday together. The holiday turns out badly and the relationship deteriorates and becomes extremely awkward. When they return home Tom leads Lynette to believe that he will be spending a while in an apartment near to his work offices. Before Lynette attends a street dinner party, Penny reveals to her that Tom had left her a note. Lynette is surprised and finds that Tom's unpacked suitcase from the holiday is not in the bedroom, convincing her that Tom had left her. After revealing to Susan that she thought Tom had left her, Lynette walks into her house, finding Tom, chopping up salad ingredients. He tells Lynette that he had only gone to buy the ingredients. Lynette questions him why it had taken him two hours, leading Tom to reveal that he had left but came back when he considered that Lynette would have to lie about where Tom was to her friends at the dinner party. The two talk for a while and Lynette confesses that when she thought Tom had left, she felt relieved, leading the pair to finally decide to separate.

In the same evening that Lynette decides to separate from Tom, she, along with Bree and Susan, walk into Gaby's living room to find that Carlos has murdered Alejandro, Gaby's stepfather. The four ladies agree to cover up the murder to protect Carlos, stuffing the body in a wooden box used as a table at the evening's dinner party.

Season 8
Not only is Lynette suffering strain from the murder but she is also having a tough time with her separation from Tom. At first she is reluctant to tell the children, but after she has a one-night stand with Tom, he decides to tell them. They then clash over Tom letting the children have whatever they want, making Lynette the bad person who always says "No". Lynette talks to Tom about booking couples therapy to try to heal their relationship. However, after Renee comments that Tom has been taking care of himself lately (dressing smartly and working out) and suspects he has been dating someone, Lynette becomes worried. She goes to a gym class with Renee to spy on the trainer she believes Tom is seeing, but realizes he is actually dating the woman's mother, Jane, leaving Lynette devastated. Terrified of what would happen to her children if she is caught by Chuck, Lynette confesses her secret to Tom just as he is about to leave for Paris with Jane. He decides not to go, leaving his relationship on the rocks, which leaves him furious with Lynette. Lynette then feels bad about him having to stay for her, as he thinks that she might be the "one". Lynette then tells him to go to Paris. This leads Lynette to try to experiment with new dates herself, and meets a new man, who seems very keen on her. She finally sleeps with Renee's barber and moves on, though at first she cries during the sex. She along with her friends finally find out that Bree tried to commit suicide because of them, and after Bree rejects them, was loss for words. Just as Lynette is getting used to single life, Porter and Preston move back home, needing a place to stay after losing their apartment. Lynette is already frazzled when she learns that Porter is the father of Julie Mayer's baby, making Susan and Lynette grandmothers.

Her world is further shocked when Tom asks for a divorce, and announces that he and Jane will be moving in together. Lynette is devastated, and her rivalry with Jane becomes more heated at Penny's birthday party when they continually try to one up each other. Jane then later tries to reconcile with Lynette, but then she begins to choke on a snack. Lynette hesitates to help Jane, but ultimately comes to her aid and saves her. However, Jane is alarmed at Lynette thinking such an action over believing she thought of letting Jane die. Then on the day of Mike Delfino's funeral, Tom and Lynette comfort each other as Jane looks on. Sparks of their marriage appear and while sitting at the service Lynette thinks back to the day Tom moved out. Mike tries to understand why Lynette isn't fighting for her marriage. He then reveals that everyone in the neighborhood knows that she and Tom belong together. This memory finally causes Lynette to make the decision to fight for her marriage, win Tom back, and dissolve his romance with Jane. In With So Little to Be Sure Of Lynette and Tom officially sign their divorce papers ending their marriage.
When Lynette hears Tom hasn't filed the papers, she is hopeful but after seeing Tom and Jane kiss at the office, she accepts a date from Tom's boss. It goes well at first but when he plans to transfer Tom to India, Lynette breaks it off. The boss sardonically insults Lynette before Tom about her being hung up on another man and after insults to her, Tom punches him. He and Jane argue with Jane realizing that Tom still loves Lynette and they break up. Tom goes to see Lynette but sees her hugging Lee and (not seeing who it is), thinks Lynette has moved on. He tells her he is filing but in a later talk, they realize how much they love each other and reconcile.

Katherine Mayfair comes back to Wisteria Lane, offering Lynette a job at her new food company. Lynette doesn't want it as she and Tom are together again but wants to prove herself. At first taken aback, Tom lets Lynette know he'll support her no matter what. It's revealed in the final moments that the two move to New York, Lynette becoming a successful businesswoman and eventually watching over six grandchildren.

In the finale, Julie gives birth to Porter's daughter, who is Scavo's granddaughter.

Creation and casting 
Series creator Marc Cherry partially based Lynette off of his mother Martha in being an overwhelmed mother.

In 2019, Eva Longoria wrote a letter claiming that she was bullied on the set of Desperate Housewives and that it was Huffman who helped her by telling the "bully" to leave her alone and it ceased: "Felicity could feel that I was riddled with anxiety even though I never complained or mentioned the abuse to anyone."

Reception 
Along with costars Marcia Cross and Teri Hatcher, Huffman was nominated for the Golden Globe Award for Best Performance by an Actress in a Television Comedy Series in 2005. She lost to Hatcher.

Reviewing the first season, Tricia Mayes wrote that Lynette was "perhaps the person we cheer for the most". Mayes cites Lynette's storylines with her children as proof that Cherry "recognizes that every mother has been driven to the edge by her kids at one point." Brooke Johnson admitted that while Bree was her favorite of the four housewives, she was closer to Lynette, who she called "the classic representation of the repressed wife" with an "intriguing aspect" of fighting back. In a review of the second season, James O'Neill quipped, "If Marcia Cross was the real star of season one then it's Felicity Huffman who really shines this time around." Admitting that her stories "do take a while to get going", O'Neill was drawn to the plot of Lynette and Tom working together.

Screen Rant ranked Lynette as the 7th best Desperate Housewives character, writing that she was "definitely nicer and more watchable than Edie" and not "always the most sympathetic character".

References

Desperate Housewives characters
Fictional female businesspeople
Television characters introduced in 2004
Fictional housewives
Fictional characters with cancer